Kataomoi means "unrequited love" in Japanese. It may refer to:

 Kataomoi (album), a 1997 album and its title song by Mayumi Iizuka
 "Kataomoi" (song), a 2002 song by Jun Shibata
 "Kataomoi" (Michiru Maki song), a 1969 song by Michru Maki that was covered by Mie Nakao in 1971 and Akina Nakamori in 1994
 "Kataomoi", a 2012 single and its title song by Miwa
 "Kataomoi", a 2017 song by Japanese singer Aimer